The Eclectic Society of Phi Nu Theta was originally a college fraternity at Wesleyan University in Middletown, Connecticut, and as such was one of the oldest fraternal collegiate organizations in the United States. In the 1970s the alumni and active members split; the building was sold to the university, and the Eclectic organization continued in the form of a co-ed cooperative living space, now sharing the building with Wesleyan's dance organization, Movement House. In recent years the organization has dropped use of its Greek letters.

The Eclectic society of Phi Nu Theta was founded by: 
 Herman Merrills Johnson
 Jonathan Coe
 Joshua Newhall
 Clark Titus Hinman
 Chester Dormund Hubbard

(Chandler Robbins was also elected that night but was initiated a week later.) The early Wesleyan societies adopted English names, and not Greek ones; but Eclectic quickly adopted a motto, the Greek initials of which are Phi Nu Theta, and the society operated under both names.

The society has always claimed an 1837 foundation for itself, for reasons understood by the members, although no advocate of the society has refuted the accepted date of the founding meeting, which is held to have taken place in late 1838. Eclectic was Wesleyan's second fraternity, after the Mystical 7.

In the 1850s a Beta chapter existed for ten years at Ohio Wesleyan University and a Gamma chapter enjoyed a month's existence at Dickinson College in Pennsylvania, but both succumbed to the perturbations accompanying the Civil War or to anti-fraternity sentiment among faculty members. There were long discussions about a chapter at Genesee College which proved unfruitful. Thereafter, the only chapter was the Alpha chapter at Wesleyan University in Connecticut.

Eclectic Society of Phi Nu Theta to 1970 
The Eclectic Society, Phi Nu Theta, was founded in 1838, as is clear from the first meeting date of the society. However, Eclectic has always claimed an 1837 founding date, making it presumptively as old as its older competitor, the Mystical 7 society. (The Mystical 7 is known to have been in existence on  when an acknowledgement on that date was received from the president of the university.)

None of the original Wesleyan societies, the Mystical 7, Eclectic, Tub Philosophers, or Thecanians, had a Greek-letter name. As other Greek-letter societies came to Wesleyan, Eclectic did quickly adopt a Greek motto, and has since been equally known as Phi Nu Theta as Eclectic (with one or the other dominating different eras).

The original society might not have survived the stresses of the Civil War without the tireless dedication of William North Rice, '65, who later went on to become a professor at the university for 51 years and also from time to time as acting president of the university. He was universally regarded as the guiding spirit of the society through the 1920s.

In 1863, the Eclectic society's meeting place is said to have been vandalized and robbed by rival fraternity Chi Psi, which was shut down on the same year.

From about 1856 to 1865 the Eclectic Society were partners in the Alpha Eating Club with the Mystical 7. After 1865, Eclectics controlled the club exclusively, and the Alpha Eating Club survived until 1975.

The alumni organization of Eclectic was incorporated by the Connecticut legislature as the Socratic Literary Society in 1870.

The first permanent home for the society was constructed in 1882 on a site behind the Allbriton Center where Cross Street currently runs; this had no residential accommodations for undergraduates, and was used for meetings, dining facilities, and society offices. The society in 1906 hired Henry Bacon, formerly of the architectural firm McKim, Mead and White to design a Doric Greek revival structure at 200 High Street. This new house was an exemplary design for group living. Many people see the Eclectic house as a design precursor to Bacon's later Lincoln Memorial in Washington, D.C. (They are both designed in a strong Doric style, but lack the typical pediment.) The Alpha Eating Club was housed in the lower stories of the southern wing of the house. The building was listed on the National Register of Historic Places in 2013.

In 1912, at the seventy-fifth reunion of the society, Stephen Henry Olin reported in an address to the society that after a detailed analysis of the academic standing of each college fraternity chapter at every major university in America back to the 1820s, Phi Nu Theta then had the highest academic ranking of any chapter of any fraternity in the country.

Noted alumni of the old Phi Nu Theta Eclectic include Chester D. Hubbard, a founder of Eclectic, and his son, member William P. Hubbard, both prominent at the founding convention of the State of West Virginia, Frederick W. Pitkin '58, two-term governor of Colorado from 1879, the congressman and banker Frederick M. Davenport, Walter B. Wriston, who presided over the development of modern consumer banking and the ATM while serving as president and CEO of Citibank, now known as Citicorp, and poet Charles Olson. The list of society alumni also includes several Wesleyan University presidents, including Joseph Cummings '40, (former president of Genesee College, later president of Northwestern University), Cyrus David Foss '54, John W. Beach '45, William North Rice '65 (Acting), Stephen Henry Olin '66 (Acting), John Monroe Van Vleck '50 (Acting), and Edwin Deacon Etherington, '48.
 
Many buildings on Wesleyan University's campus are named after prominent Eclectic members, such as Crowell Concert Hall, Olin Memorial Library (Stephen Henry Olin, '65 and his father), Hall and Atwater Labs, the Zilkha Gallery (Ezra Khedouri Zilka, '46 and his wife), and the Van Vleck Observatory, (Astronomy Professor John Monroe Van Vleck).

A history of the society has recently been published by the Wesleyan University Press, called A History of The Eclectic Society of Phi Nu Theta, 1837–1970. The author, William B.B. Moody, is a member and an alumnus of the class of 1959.

One society or two? 
In 1970, the undergraduates broke ranks with their alumni, the primary issue at the time being one of recreational drug use. There is a serious and ongoing question as to whether the current organization is a continuation of the old or not. See 1991 Argus letters After a wrenching crisis at the annual meeting of alumni in 1970, the alumni severed ties with the undergraduate institution and dissolved the Socratic Literary Society alumni organization, at the same time, the undergraduates abandoned the initiation ceremony and the constitution, women were elected to membership, the name "Phi Nu Theta" was abandoned as sounding too much like a Greek-letter fraternity. At the same time, the alumni closed the Alpha Dining Club, the permanent staff (housekeeper and chef) were let go, and the house was sold to the university. For some, the new organization was entirely different, and any connection to the older organization was utterly severed; for others, the new organization continues the principles and community position of the old. In recent years, the students living in Eclectic have attempted to rebuild connections to the older alumni with events during Homecoming and Family Weekend and Commencement & Reunion Weekend.

Because of the prestige of the older organization, the prominent position played by the current organization in student life, and other factors, the Wesleyan University administration has never fully pushed the issue of whether the old Eclectic and the new Eclectic were two organizations or one, and for 40 years the house has continued on in this state of ambiguity.

Eclectic Society since 1970 
The current society has operated without a constitution for extended periods, and has adopted a Quaker -style consensus decision-making system. The consensus system was formalized under a set of by-laws authored by member Paul Menair in the mid-1980s.

Alumni of the newer Eclectic include Le1f, Chris Wink, co-founder of Blue Man Group; Amanda Palmer, songwriter and singer of The Dresden Dolls; Ben Goldwasser, Will Berman and Andrew VanWyngarden of the neo-psychedelic band MGMT; Jem Cohen, an independent film maker who has worked with R.E.M. and Fugazi, filmmaker Joss Whedon, Willie Garson, character actor in many movies and TV shows such as Sex and the City and White Collar, Himanshu Suri of the rap group Das Racist, Simon O'Connor of the band Stylophone and Amazing Baby, and Keenan Mitchell and Fareed Sajan of the band Bottle Up and Go.

The script for the film PCU was written by Wesleyan students Adam Leff and Zak Penn, (not members but regulars at the house), and is derived from life and characters in that house at the time. The early scenes at the house in PCU refer to the older, formerly prestigious organization.

On January 19, 2010, Eric Conger's play The Eclectic Society premiered at the Walnut Street Theatre in Philadelphia. The play centers on a fraternity at an unnamed New England college in the early 1960s, as they collide with race, class, and gender issues, while a new world prepares to unfold under the JFK administration.

References

External links

Eclectic Society Website
"A History of the Eclectic Society of Phi Nu Theta 1837-1970"
"The Eclectic Society" by Eric Conger, world premiere at The Walnut Street Theatre

Fraternities and sororities in the United States
Wesleyan University
Student organizations established in 1838
National Register of Historic Places in Middlesex County, Connecticut
1838 establishments in Connecticut